Sherzad شیرزاد is the district center of Sherzad District in the west of Nangarhar Province, Afghanistan. The population is 100% Pashtun.

War in Afghanistan
In 2019, Afghan Special Forces raided the district, killing 43 Taliban militants. US forces also conducted airstrikes in the district.

References

External links
Map of Sherzad district (PDF)
UNHCR District Profile, dated 2002-05-14, accessed 2006-07-24 (PDF).

Populated places in Nangarhar Province